Rudolf 'Rudy' Wetzer (17 March 1901 – 13 April 1993) was a Romanian football player and manager.  He was the captain and team-coach alongside Octav Luchide, under the management of Costel Rădulescu of the first Romanian side to participate in a FIFA World Cup. He was of Jewish ethnicity.
His brothers Ștefan and Ioan were also footballers.

Career
In club football Wezter played for Juventus București (who were Romanian national champions in 1929–1930 season), as such he was a colleague of squad members Vogl and Ladislau Raffinsky. In the 1920s he had played for Unirea Timişoara (appearing, whilst with them, at the 1924 Olympic Games) and Chinezul before moving on.  His last matches for Romania (played while he was playing for Ripensia were in 1932; his last match came in a 2–0 defeat to Bulgaria in Belgrade. Otherwise he played for BSK Belgrade, Újpest FC, Pécs-Baranya, Hyères FC, ILSA Timișoara and Craiovan Craiova. While playing in Hungary, he used the name Rudolf Veder, in Serbia, Rudolf Večer.

When BSK brought Wetzer along another Romanian, Dezideriu Laki, to its team in 1924, they became the first foreign professionals to play in Serbia.

International career
During the 1930 FIFA World Cup Wetzer became Romania's team captain and team-coach alongside Octav Luchide, under the management of Costel Rădulescu. This was Rădulescu's decision in the weeks prior to the tournament. In May 1930 the Romanians had lost the King Alexander's Cup (a two team event) to Yugoslavia in Belgrade. At the time Emerich Vogl was team captain.  Wetzer was brought back into the side two weeks' later for a friendly against Greece in Bucharest.  This decision reaped considerable rewards for both Rădulescu and Wetzer because Wetzer scored 5 goals in an 8–1 victory for his team. Romania had been grouped with Uruguay and Peru in the tournament, defeating the Peruvians 3–1 before losing to the eventual winners and hosts 4–0. The second of these games was held at the Estadio Centenario in Montevideo.

Wetzer was a very prolific scorer for Romania. He and Bodola were the top two goalscorers of the 1929–31 (first) edition of the Balkan Cup (which Romania won). They scored 7 goals each for their country in that tournament alone.

In total Wetzer was to play 17 times for Romania scoring 13 goals.

Coaching career
After retiring as a footballer Wetzer became a trainer. In 1958, during a purge by the ruling national party against "revisionism and bourgeois ideology, indiscipline and descriptive anarchic elements" Wetzer became subject to an order forbidding him from "leaving the collective in which he was engaged without good reason, under penalty of being expelled from the trainers' corps.

Honours

Player
Chinezul Timișoara
Divizia A: 1925–26, 1926–27
Juventus București
Divizia A: 1929–30

Coach
Ripensia Timișoara
Divizia A: 1934–35

References

External links
 
 

1901 births
1993 deaths
Sportspeople from Timișoara
People from the Kingdom of Hungary
Romanian footballers
Romania international footballers
Romanian expatriate footballers
Association football forwards
Olympic footballers of Romania
Footballers at the 1924 Summer Olympics
Liga I players
Újpest FC players
FC Ripensia Timișoara players
FC Petrolul Ploiești players
OFK Beograd players
Yugoslav First League players
Expatriate footballers in Yugoslavia
Expatriate footballers in Hungary
Expatriate footballers in France
1930 FIFA World Cup players
Romanian football managers
FC Petrolul Ploiești managers
CSM Reșița managers
FC Dinamo București managers
FC Ripensia Timișoara managers
Austro-Hungarian Jews
Jewish footballers
Jewish Romanian sportspeople
Romanian emigrants to Israel
Romanian expatriate sportspeople in France
Romanian expatriate sportspeople in Hungary
Romanian expatriate sportspeople in Yugoslavia